Gintaras Kvitkauskas (born 3 January 1967) is a retired Lithuanian international footballer who played as a midfielder.

Kvitkauskas played in the Soviet Top League with FK Žalgiris Vilnius and FC Pakhtakor Tashkent. He was the third Lithuanian to sign for FC Dynamo Kyiv, appearing in six Ukrainian Premier League matches and European matches against Barcelona FC and SL Benfica.

References

External links

 
Profile at Futbolinis.lt

1967 births
Living people
Soviet footballers
Lithuanian footballers
Lithuania international footballers
Lithuanian expatriate footballers
FK Žalgiris players
Pakhtakor Tashkent FK players
FC Dynamo Kyiv players
FC Dynamo-2 Kyiv players
NK Veres Rivne players
Soviet Top League players
Ukrainian Premier League players
Ukrainian First League players
Expatriate footballers in Ukraine
Lithuanian expatriate sportspeople in Ukraine
People from Varėna
Association football midfielders